Xyccarph is a genus of Brazilian goblin spiders that was first described by Paolo Marcello Brignoli in 1978.

Species
 it contains four species, found only in Brazil:
Xyccarph migrans Höfer & Brescovit, 1996 – Brazil
Xyccarph myops Brignoli, 1978 (type) – Brazil
Xyccarph tenuis (Vellard, 1924) – Brazil
Xyccarph wellingtoni Höfer & Brescovit, 1996 – Brazil

See also
 List of Oonopidae species

References

Araneomorphae genera
Oonopidae
Spiders of Brazil